UEFA Group D of the 2023 FIFA Women's World Cup qualification competition consists of six teams: England, Austria, Northern Ireland, North Macedonia, Latvia, and Luxembourg. The composition of the nine groups in the qualifying group stage was decided by the draw held on 30 April 2021, with the teams seeded according to their coefficient ranking.

The group is played in home-and-away round-robin format between 17 September 2021 and 6 September 2022, with a pause for the Women's Euro 2022 in July. The group winners qualify for the final tournament, while the runners-up advance to the play-offs first round if they are one of the other six runners-up among all nine groups (not counting results against the sixth-placed team).

Standings

Matches
Times are CET/CEST, as listed by UEFA (local times, if different, are in parentheses).

Goalscorers

Notes

References

External links
FIFA Women's World Cup, UEFA.com

Group D